Ashgrove can refer to:
 Ashgrove, Queensland, Australia
 Electoral district of Ashgrove - a former electoral district of the Legislative Assembly of Queensland, Australia
 Ashgrove, Bath and North East Somerset, England
 Ashgrove, Aberdeen, one of the Areas of Aberdeen, Scotland
 Ashgrove, Moray, Scotland
 "The Ash Grove", a Welsh folk song
 Ashgrove (album), an album by Dave Alvin
 Ashgrove (film), a 2022 Canadian drama